The 496th Tactical Fighter Squadron is an inactive United States Air Force unit, last assigned to the United States Air Forces in Europe, 50th Tactical Fighter Wing, being stationed at Hahn Air Base, Germany.   The squadron was inactivated on 15 May 1991.

The unit was first activated in 1942, and served until April 1944 as a replacement and operational training unit for light bombardment and fighter-bomber units and crews.  It was active as a reserve unit from 1949 to 1951, flying the aircraft of the regular 52d Fighter-All Weather Group until it was called to active duty for the Korean War and its personnel used to fill out other units.

Its longest period of active duty started in 1953, when it was activated as an interceptor squadron.  After training in the Western United States, it moved to Germany, serving in the air defense of Western Europe until 1968, when it converted to the tactical fighter mission.

History

World War II
The squadron was activated in 1942 as the 301st Bombardment Squadron  (Light) at Hunter Field, Georgia, and equipped with Douglas A-24 Banshee dive bombers as one of the original squadron s of the 84th Bombardment Group. It received its initial cadre and equipment from the 3d Bombardment Group. It operated briefly with Vultee V-72 (A-31 Vengeance) aircraft, but its operations showed this aircraft was unsuitable for dive bombing. The squadron served as an Operational Training Unit (OTU), acting as the parent for elements of several light bombardment groups.

In 1943, the squadron was redesignated as the 496th Fighter-Bomber Squadron as were other AAF single engine bombardment units, and was re-equipped with Republic P-47 Thunderbolts. It continued to serve as an OTU until October 1943. The OTU program involved the use of an oversized parent unit to provide cadres to "satellite groups." During the fall of 1943, operations dwindled and by the end of September 1943 only five aircraft were assigned to the entire 84th Group.

The squadron then became a Replacement Training Unit (RTU) and also participated occasionally in demonstrations and maneuvers. RTUs were also oversized units, but with the mission of training individual pilots or aircrews. However, the AAF found that standard military units, based on relatively inflexible tables of organization were proving less well adapted to the training mission in the US.  Accordingly, a more functional system was adopted in which each base was organized into a separate numbered unit. The squadron was, therefore, disbanded in April 1944 and replaced by the 261st AAF Base Unit (Combat Crew Training School, Fighter), which took over the personnel, equipment and mission of the squadron at Abilene Army Air Field.

Air reserve

The May 1949 Air Force Reserve program called for a new type of unit, the corollary unit, which was a reserve unit integrated with an active duty unit.  The plan called for corollary units at 107 locations.  It was viewed as the best method to train reservists by mixing them with an existing regular unit to perform duties alongside the regular unit.  
 As part of this program, the squadron was reconstituted as the 496th Fighter Squadron, All Weather and activated at Mitchel Air Force Base, New York in the Air Force Reserves to train as a fighter corollary unit of the 52d Fighter Group of the regular Air Force, moving with the 52d to McGuire Air Force Base, New Jersey a few months later. The squadron was apparently undermanned and thus performed very little training. During its only 2-week summer encampment (12–26 June 1950), the entire 84th Group had only four pilots capable of flying the 52d's North American F-82 Twin Mustangs provided for their training. Like other corollary units, the 84th Group seems to have been poorly manned, and the parent 52d Fighter-All Weather Wing made little use of its corollary units, focusing on its combat mission instead. The 84th Group was ordered to active service on 1 June 1951, inactivated the next day, and its few people became "fillers" for the 52d Wing or, if there was no vacancy in the 52d, for other USAF units.

Interceptor operations

Activated briefly at Hamilton Air Force Base, California in early 1953, equipped with North American F-86F Sabres, performed air defense of the West Coast of the United States.   Reassigned to the United States Air Forces in Europe, assigned to the 86th Fighter-Interceptor Wing at Landstuhl Air Base, West Germany in 1954.  Mission in USAFE was air defense of West Germany, flying North American F-86D Sabre interceptors.

Moved to Hahn Air Base in November 1956, remaining assigned to the 86th.  Operated from Hahn for the next decade, being re-equipped with the F-102A Delta Dagger in 1959.

Tactical fighter operations

Reassigned to the host 50th TFW at Hahn in 1968 as part of the withdrawal of the F-102 from Europe, being re-equipped with McDonnell F-4E Phantom IIs and becoming a tactical Fighter Squadron.    Continued routine training operations throughout the 1970s, upgrading to General Dynamics F-16 Fighting Falcon aircraft in 1982.

Inactivated in 1991 with the host 50th Tactical Fighter Wing at Hahn and part of the closure of the base and the end of the Cold War.

Lineage
 Constituted as the 301st Bombardment Squadron (Light) on 13 January 1942
 Activated on 10 February 1942
 Redesignated 301st Bombardment Squadron (Dive) on 27 July 1942
 Redesignated 496th Fighter-Bomber Squadron on 10 August 1943
 Disbanded on 1 April 1944
 Reconstituted, and redesignated 496th Fighter Squadron, All Weather on 16 May 1949
 Activated in the reserve on 1 June 1949
 Redesignated 496th Fighter-All Weather Squadron on 1 March 1950
 Ordered to active service on 1 June 1951
 Inactivated on 2 June 1951
 Redesignated 496th Fighter-Interceptor Squadron on 11 February 1953
 Activated on 20 March 1953
 Redesignated 496th Tactical Fighter Squadron, 1 November 1968
 Inactivated 15 May 1991

Assignments
 84th Bombardment Group (later 84th Fighter-Bomber Group), 10 February 1942 – 1 April 1944
 84th Fighter Group, 1 June 1949 – 2 June 1951
 566th Air Defense Group, 20 March 1953
 Twelfth Air Force (attached to 86th Fighter-Bomber Wing), 1 July 1954
 7486th Air Defense Group (later 7486th Air Base Group), 2 December 1954
 86th Fighter-Interceptor Group, 3 January 1956
 86th Fighter-Interceptor Wing (later 86th Air Division), 8 March 1958 (attached to 50th Tactical Fighter Wing after 1 November 1968)
 50th Tactical Fighter Wing, 25 November 1968 – 15 May 1991

Stations
 Hunter Field, Georgia, 10 February 1942
 Drew Field, Florida, 8 February 1943
 Harding Field, Louisiana, 4 October 1943
 Hammond Army Air Field, Louisiana, 9 November 1943
 Abilene Army Air Field, Texas, 11 February – 1 April 1944.
 Mitchel Air Force Base, New York, 1 June 1949
 McGuire Air Force Base, New Jersey, 10 October 1949 – 2 June 1951
 Hamilton Air Force Base, California, 20 March 1953
 Landstuhl Air Base, Germany, 4 July 1954
 Hahn Air Base, Germany, 8 November 1956 – 15 May 1991

Aircraft

 Vultee V-72 Vengeance, 1942
 Douglas A-24 Banshee, 1942–1943
 Bell P-39 Airacobra, 1943
 Republic P-47 Thunderbolt, 1943–1944
 North American F-51 Mustang, 1953
 North American F-86D Sabre, 1953–1960
 Convair F-102 Delta Dagger, 1959–1970
 McDonnell F-4 Phantom II, 1970–1982
 General Dynamics F-16 Fighting Falcon, 1982–1991

References

 Notes

 Citations

Bibliography

External links
 USAFHRA 50th Space Wing Fact Sheet

Fighter squadrons of the United States Air Force